Andrew Michael Scott Francis is a Canadian actor. He has appeared in many television shows and films including My Little Pony: Friendship is Magic as Shining Armor, MegaMan NT Warrior as MegaMan.EXE, Hero 108 as Lin Chung, Lamb Chop's Play Along, Sushi Pack, Poltergeist: The Legacy, Dark Angel, Twilight Zone, The L Word, Smallville, Kyle XY, and Chesapeake Shores. He has also appeared in theatrical releases such as Knockaround Guys, Agent Cody Banks, Final Destination 3, and The Invisible.

Career
Andrew has also been voice acting since the age of 9, starring in over 20 animated series, including many anime series, such as: RoboCop: Alpha Commando, X-Men: Evolution as Robert 'Bobby' Drake/Iceman, Johnny Test as Gil Nexdor, Action Man, Dragon Booster as Phistus, Hot Wheels: Acceleracers as Vert Wheeler, Voltron Force as Lance, Max Steel as Max McGrath, Slugterra as Kord Zane, Ninjago: Masters of Spinjitzu as Morro, and his main role as Cole in Season 15: Crystallized, Monster Rancher, Vision of Escaflowne, and Dinotrux as Ty Rux.

Filmography

References

External links

Living people
Canadian male film actors
Canadian male television actors
Canadian male video game actors
Canadian male voice actors
20th-century Canadian male actors
21st-century Canadian male actors
Place of birth missing (living people)
1985 births